Air Commodore Geoffrey Dalton Stephenson,  (19 January 1910 – 8 November 1954) was a senior Royal Air Force officer. He served as Commandant of the Central Flying School and Central Fighter Establishment, and Aide-de-Camp to the monarch.

Commanding a squadron during the Dunkirk evacuation in May 1940, Stephenson was shot down, crash-landed his Spitfire on the beach and was taken prisoner. Stephenson was killed in an air crash on 8 November 1954 while on a tour of the United States.

Background

The 44-year-old pilot had flown several thousand hours in fighter aircraft, both conventional and jet, during his 20-year RAF career. He had piloted virtually every type of British jet fighter including Meteors, Venoms, Hunters and Swifts, as well as USAF F-86s. He was considered one of the most experienced and capable fighter pilots in the RAF. Commodore Stephenson was married and father of three children.

Before the Second World War, Stephenson had been a member of the Royal Air Force aerobatic team. As squadron leader of 19 Squadron based at RAF Duxford, he was shot down on Sunday, 26 May 1940, in Spitfire Ia, N3200, coded 'QV', while covering the evacuation of the Dunkirk beaches during Operation Dynamo, crash-landing his fighter on the sands at the shoreline. According to the Imperial War Museum, Stephenson was captured on the beach in France shortly after crashing.

Multiple escape attempts led to his transfer to Oflag IV-C at Colditz Castle where he would participate in the creation of the never-flown Colditz Cock glider. Following the war, Stephenson served as the personal pilot for King George VI.

Remarkably, Spitfire N3200 was rediscovered and salvaged from the beach in 1986, and restored to flight in March 2014, with the markings worn when it was downed.

Fatal crash
Air Commodore Stephenson headed a six-man team from the central fighter establishment, RAF, whose headquarters are at RAF West Raynham near Fakenham, Norfolk. They were at Eglin Air Force Base, Florida, home of the Air Proving Ground Center, on an exchange tour.

On 8 November 1954, Air Commodore Stephenson was flying a USAF F-100A-10-NA Super Sabre, 53-1534, near Auxiliary Field 2 of Eglin Air Force Base, Florida.

Funeral
Memorial services were held at 0900 hrs. at the Eglin Base chapel on 10 November 1954, conducted by the Rev. Johnson H. Pace of St. Simons on the Sound church, Fort Walton Beach, Florida, and attended by Air Vice-Marshal R. L. R. Atcherley, chief of the Chief Joint British Services Mission to the United States, who arrived from Washington on the night of 9 November; Major General Patrick W Timberlake, commander of the Air Proving Ground Command; Brig. Gen. Daniel S. Campbell, deputy commander of the APGC; six Royal Air Force officers who were touring the U.S. with the Air Commodore; and key staff officers of the APGC. At 1200 hrs., the party of Air Commodore Stephenson, accompanied by 30 RAF and USAF officers, flew to Maxwell Air Force Base, Montgomery, Alabama, for interment at the Royal Air Force plot there. British armed forces traditionally bury their dead where they fall. There has been an RAF squad at Maxwell since World War II.

References

External links
Air Commodore G D Stephenson (26165) Air of Authority

Royal Air Force air commodores
Aviators killed in aviation accidents or incidents in the United States
1954 deaths
1910 births
Royal Air Force pilots of World War II
Shot-down aviators
British World War II prisoners of war
World War II prisoners of war held by Germany